Gandy Brodie (May 20, 1924 - October 22, 1975) was an American painter working primarily in New York City and Townshend, Vermont during the middle part of the 20th century.  He had ties to Abstract Expressionism through artists such as Willem de Kooning and his style, though singular, was considered second-generation Abstract Expressionism. His paintings were influenced by the works of artists such as Camille Corot, Paul Cézanne, Vincent van Gogh, Piet Mondrian, Chaïm Soutine, Georges Rouault, Pablo Picasso, and Paul Klee. Shane Brody, his only child, is a jazz and Americana guitarist who resides in Underhill, Vermont.

Personal life
Gabriel Solomon Brodie was born May 20, 1924 in Brooklyn, New York to a family of Romanian Jewish produce vendors. Brodie lived and worked in and around New York City throughout his life, while also spending extensive time in Florence, Italy, Provincetown, Massachusetts, and West Townshend, Vermont.  He and his wife, Jocelyn Brodie, and are remembered for their establishment of The Gandy Brodie School of Art in Newfane, Vermont.

Career
Brodie started out as a self-taught painter, arriving at painting only after studying dance with Martha Graham and delving into the world of jazz and bebop. Once he discovered painting, he dedicated himself to learning from fellow artists and from works he could access in the museums of New York. After a time, he studied with Hans Hofmann and with the art historian, Meyer Schapiro, who praised Brodie as “one of the best painters of his generation.”

He was the winner of many awards, including a Guggenheim Fellowship, a National Council for The Arts Award, a Longview Foundation Purchase Grant, an Ingram Merrill Foundation Award, a Mark Twain Art award, and numerous residencies at colleges and universities nationwide. In addition, Brodie taught at Carnegie-Mellon University, The University of Pennsylvania and Elmira College, in Elmira New York, where he was a Fine Arts Instructor at the time of his death.

Brodie’s work is characterized by dense layers of paint, or drawn marks, culminating in an abstract, yet vivid encapsulation of everyday objects such as a flower in a can, a tree in the park, a sea gull over the ocean, or a tenement in New York. He was known for painting and drawing certain subjects repeatedly throughout his relatively short career. The subjects are often, at first glance, indiscernible from thick paint or charcoal marks; however, his reoccurring motifs become more recognizable once viewed in relation to his other works.

Brodie died on October 22, 1975 at the age of 51. A memorial for Brodie was held at The New School for Social Research, in New York City. Among the speakers were Meyer Shapiro and Elaine de Kooning. After his death, exhibitions of Brodie's art continued to be shown at the Sidney Janis, Knoedler, Edward Thorpe, and Salander - O'Rielly galleries. Brodie's work is currently represented by Steven Harvey Fine Art Project, New York. Brodie’s paintings and drawings can be found in Museum collections including the Hirshhorn Museum and Sculpture Garden, the Metropolitan Museum of Art, the Neuberger Museum of Art, and The Phillips Collection.

Notes

References

External links 
  John Yau "A Wonderer Among the Rubble (Part 1)" Hyperallergic.com, June 17, 2012
  John Yau, "A Wonderer Among The Rubble (Part 2), Hyperallergic.com, June 24, 2012.
  Samet, Beer With A Painter: Pat de Groot, Hyperallergic.com, Sept 7, 2013

1924 births
1975 deaths
People from Brooklyn
20th-century American painters
American male painters
Abstract expressionist artists
University of Pennsylvania faculty
Carnegie Mellon University faculty
American expatriates in Italy